Ignacio Ruiz is an Argentinean rugby union player who plays as Hooker for London Irish in the Premiership.

Career 
Ruiz began his rugby career at Argentine URBA Top13 side Regatas de Bella Vista. In 2020 he joined SRA side Jagaures XV. 

In 2022 he joined English Premiership side London Irish joining four other Argentine internationals.

International Career 
Ruiz made his debut against Scotland on Saturday 16 July 2022. 

Living people
2001 births
Argentine rugby union players
Argentina international rugby union players
Rugby union hookers
Jaguares (Super Rugby) players
London Irish players
Rugby union players from Buenos Aires